James Roche (b Midleton 19 October 1870; d Cobh 31 August 1956) was a 20th century Irish Roman Catholic Bishop.

He served as Bishop of Ross from 1926 to 1931;Coadjutor Bishop of Cloyne and Titular Bishop of Sebastopolis in Armeniafrom 1931 to 1935; and Roman Catholic Bishop of Cloyne from 1935 until his death. He is buried at St Cemetery in Cobh.

References

Clergy from Cobh
1870 births
1956 deaths
20th-century Roman Catholic bishops in Ireland
Alumni of St Patrick's College, Maynooth
Roman Catholic bishops of Cloyne
Roman Catholic Bishops of Ross
James